Mihr Mardan (Persian: مهر مردان) was the third ruler of the Bavand dynasty from 717 to 755. Nothing more is known about him; he died in 755, and was succeeded by his son Surkhab II.

Sources
 

Bavand dynasty
8th-century monarchs in Asia
8th-century Iranian people
755 deaths
Year of birth unknown
Zoroastrian rulers